Kristján Arason (born 23 July 1961) is a former member of Icelandic national handball team. He is the husband of Þorgerður Katrín Gunnarsdóttir, a well-known figure in Icelandic politics. He ranked fourth in IHF's list of the world's best handball players in the year 1989. He is considered among the best defenders in the history of handball. He won the Icelandic championship with FH (Fimleikafélag Hafnarfjarðar)as a coach in the year 2011.

See also
List of handballers with 1000 or more international goals

References

1961 births
Living people
Kristjan Arason
Kristjan Arason
Handball players at the 1984 Summer Olympics
Handball players at the 1988 Summer Olympics